Mexico and Sweden are both members of the Organisation for Economic Co-operation and Development and the United Nations.

History 

Initial relations between Mexico and Sweden began in 1850 when a Swedish consulate was opened in Veracruz City. On 29 July 1885, the Treaty of Friendship, Commerce and Navigation was signed between the two nations. In 1956, the Swedish embassy in Mexico City opened.

In 1980, Mexican President José López Portillo paid an official visit to Sweden. In 1982, King Carl XVI Gustaf of Sweden and Queen Silvia of Sweden paid an official visit to Mexico. The monarchs would later pay a second state visit to Mexico in 2002. There have also been several high levels visits by Mexican presidents and Swedish prime ministers to each other's countries respectively.

In 1982, Alfonso García Robles of Mexico and Alva Myrdal of Sweden received a Nobel Peace Prize "[for] their magnificent work in the disarmament negotiations of the United Nations, where they have both played crucial roles and won international recognition". In 2013, Swedish Prime Minister Fredrik Reinfeldt paid an official visit to Mexico and met with Mexican President Enrique Peña Nieto. During the visit, both nations stressed the importance of the relations between both nations and signed several bilateral agreements.

High-level visits

High-level visits from Mexico to Sweden
 
 President José López Portillo (1980)
 President Miguel de la Madrid (1988)
 President Carlos Salinas de Gortari (1993)
 President Vicente Fox (2003)

High-level visits from Sweden to Mexico

 Prime Minister Thorbjörn Fälldin (1981)
 King Carl Gustaf XVI (1982, 2002)
 Prime Minister Olof Palme (1984)
 Prime Minister Ingvar Carlsson (1986)
 Prime Minister Fredrik Reinfeldt (2013)

Bilateral agreements 
Over the years, both nations have signed several bilateral agreements such as a Treaty of Friendship, Commerce and Navigation (1885); Agreement on the elimination of visas for ordinary passport holders (1954); Agreement on Scientific and Technical Cooperation (1980); Agreement on the avoidance of Double-Taxation and to prevent Tax fraud (1993); Free-Trade Treaty between the European Union and Mexico (1997); Agreement to establish Joint Meeting's to discuss Common Interests (1998);  Agreement on the reciprocal Promotion and Protection of Investments (2000); Agreement on Credit and Export Cooperation (2013) and an Agreement on Mining Cooperation (2013).

Transportation 
There are direct flights between Mexico and Sweden with the following airlines: Thomas Cook Airlines Scandinavia and TUI fly Nordic.

Trade 
In 1997, Mexico signed a Free Trade Agreement with the European Union (which includes Sweden). Since then, trade between the two nations have increased dramatically. In 2018, trade between Mexico and Sweden totaled $1 billion (USD). Sweden is Mexico's 31st biggest trading partner globally. Among the products that Mexico exports to Sweden are: manufactured goods and alcohol. Swedish exports to Mexico are also mainly manufactured products, automobiles and pharmaceuticals. There are over 200 Swedish companies operating in Mexico today, among them are: AstraZeneca, Ericsson, Svenska Cellulosa AB  and Volvo.

Resident diplomatic missions 

 Mexico has an embassy in Stockholm.
 Sweden has an embassy in Mexico City.

See also 
 Embassy of Sweden, Mexico City
 Scandinavian Mexicans
 Mexico–EU relations

References 

 
Sweden
Bilateral relations of Sweden